Hypenodes is a genus of moths of the family Erebidae erected by Henry Doubleday in 1850.

Taxonomy
The genus has previously been classified in the subfamily Strepsimaninae of the family Noctuidae.

Description
Palpi with second joint long and fringed with long hair above. Third joint short, naked and oblique. Frontal tuft is short. Antennae ringed and minutely ciliated in male. Thorax smoothly scaled. Abdomen with a basal dorsal tuft and almost naked tibia in legs. Forewings long and narrow. Veins 6 and 7 from near end of ell and stalked veins 8, 10 where vein 9 absent. Hindwings with veins 3,4 and 6,7 stalked. Vein 5 arise from middle of discocellulars.

Species
The humidalis species group
Hypenodes caducus Dyar, 1907 – large hypenodes moth
Hypenodes curvilinea Sugi, 1982
Hypenodes fractilinea J. B. Smith, 1908 – broken-line hypenodes moth
Hypenodes franclemonti Ferguson, 1954
Hypenodes humidalis Doubleday, 1850 - marsh oblique-barred moth
Hypenodes palustris Ferguson, 1954 (misspelled Hypenodes plaustris)
Hypenodes rectifascia Sugi, 1982
Hypenodes sombrus Ferguson, 1954
The kalchbergi species group
 Hypenodes kalchbergi Staudinger, 1876
The orientalis species group
Hypenodes anatolica Schwingenschuss, 1938
Hypenodes crimeana Fibiger, Pekarsky & Ronkay, 2010
Hypenodes cypriaca Fibiger, Pekarsky & Ronkay, 2010
Hypenodes nesiota Rebel, 1916
Hypenodes orientalis Staudinger, 1901
Hypenodes pannonica Fibiger, Pekarsky & Ronkay, 2010
Hypenodes turcomanica Fibiger, Pekarsky & Ronkay, 2010
Species group unknown
Hypenodes dubia Schaus, 1913
Hypenodes haploa D. S. Fletcher, 1961
Hypenodes insciens Dognin, 1914
Hypenodes minimalis Snellen, 1890
Hypenodes modesta Schaus, 1913
Hypenodes obliqualis Snellen, 1890
Hypenodes prionodes D. S. Fletcher, 1961
Hypenodes pudicalis Snellen, 1890

References

 Doubleday (1850). Zoologist 8
 
 

Hypenodinae
Moth genera